Randy J. Robbins (died May 18, 2015, in San Diego) was an American director.

Directing credits
The Young and the Restless (as Randy J. Robbins; 1985–1995)
Days of Our Lives (1995–2003)

Awards and nominations
Directors Guild of America Award
Nomination, 2002, for Outstanding Directorial Achievement in Daytime Serials

Daytime Emmy Award
His first Emmy win was shared with Dennis Steinmetz, Rudy Vejar, Frank Pacelli and Betty Rothenberg.
Won, 1987, 1988, 1989, 1986, for Outstanding Drama Series Directing Team
Nomination, 1987-1996, 1998, 1999, 2003, for Outstanding Drama Series Directing Team

References

External links

American film directors
2015 deaths
Year of birth missing